The  Edmonton Eskimos finished 1st in the West Division with a 13–5 record, but lost the Grey Cup at Commonwealth Stadium to the Montreal Alouettes.

Offseason

CFL Draft

Preseason

Schedule

Regular season

Season standings

Season schedule

Total attendance: 343,447 
Average attendance: 38,161 (63.5%)

Playoffs

West Final

Grey Cup

Awards and records

All-Star selections

References

Edmonton Eskimos
Edmonton Elks seasons
N. J. Taylor Trophy championship seasons